Janadhipathiya Rashtriya Party  previously known as Janadhipathiya Rashtriya Sabha is a political party in Kerala, India. The political Party JRS was formed by C. K. Janu on 10 April 2016. The JRP joined the BJP-led NDA and Janu contested unsuccessfully in the 2016 state assembly polls from Sulthan Bathery. The JRP left the NDA in 2018 but rejoined in 2021 ahead of the 2021 Kerala Legislative Assembly election.

References

Political parties in Kerala
2016 establishments in Kerala
Member parties of the National Democratic Alliance
Political parties established in 2016
State political parties in Kerala